Steeve Estatof (born 29 October 1972) is a French singer-songwriter and the winner of the second season of the French Idol show Nouvelle Star.

Estatof plays the guitar, the bass and drums. His music is strongly influenced by Nirvana, Guns N' Roses and the Sex Pistols.

His last album Le Poison idéal has been recorded in Los Angeles and has been mixed by Mike Fraser in Vancouver, Canada.

Discography

Albums

Singles

References

1972 births
Living people
People from Saint-Martin-d'Hères
French singer-songwriters
Nouvelle Star winners
21st-century French singers
21st-century French male singers
French male singer-songwriters